Northern Valley Yokuts is a dialect network within the Valley Yokuts division of the Yokutsan languages spoken in the Central Valley of California. Among the languages belonging to the network are Chawchila, Nopṭinṭe, Kechayi, Dumna, Dalinchi, Toltichi, and Chukchansi. Of these, Kechayi, Dumna, Dalinchi, Toltichi, and Chukchansi are frequently grouped under the label Northern Hill dialects.

References 

Yokutsan languages